Timothy Gerrard Jackson (born November 7, 1965) is former American football safety in the Canadian Football League (CFL) for the Hamilton Tiger-Cats and Toronto Argonauts. He also was a member of the Dallas Cowboys in the National Football League (NFL). He played college football at the University of Nebraska.

Early years
Jackson attended Skyline High School, where he practiced football and track. He was limited with multiple injuries as a senior.

He accepted a football scholarship from Kansas State University. He transferred to Coffeyville Junior College after his freshman season, where he received All-conference honors. He transferred to the University of Nebraska after his sophomore season.

As a junior, he was named the starter at free safety in the fifth game against the University of Kansas. He posted 34 tackles (2 for loss) and one pass defensed.

As a senior, he registered 43 tackles (one for loss), 4 interceptions (tied for the team lead and tied for fifth in the conference), 5 passes defensed (led the team), one sack, 3 forced fumbles (tied for the team lead) and one fumble recovery. He was a part of a defense that ranked sixth in the nation in pass defense (134.8 yards) and seventh in total defense (262.8 yards). He had 2 interceptions against Arizona State University.

Professional career
Jackson was selected by the Dallas Cowboys in the 9th round (224th overall) of the 1989 NFL Draft. He was waived on October 10.

On February 21, 1990, he signed as a free agent with the San Diego Chargers. He was released on August 6.

In 1991, he played in the inaugural season of the World League of American Football. He was a starting cornerback for the Barcelona Dragons.

On June 12, 1991, he signed with the Hamilton Tiger-Cats of the Canadian Football League. He had 56 tackles, 3 interceptions, 10 special teams tackles and 2 fumble recoveries (including one for a touchdown). In 1992, he collected 49 tackles and 2 fumble recoveries. In 1993, he tallied 46 tackles and 2 interceptions. On July 4, 1994, he was placed on the injured reserve list.

On July 26, 1994, he was signed by the Toronto Argonauts of the Canadian Football League. He was activated on September 1.

References

1965 births
Living people
Players of American football from Dallas
Players of Canadian football from Dallas
American football safeties
Kansas State Wildcats football players
Coffeyville Red Ravens football players
Nebraska Cornhuskers football players
Dallas Cowboys players
Barcelona Dragons players
Hamilton Tiger-Cats players
Toronto Argonauts players